Deh-e Khvajeh castle is a historical castle located in Rafsanjan County in Kerman Province. The longevity of this fortress dates back to the Late Centuries Historical Periods of Islam.

References 

Castles in Iran